Krip-Hop is a movement demonstrating alternate arrangements by which hip hop artists with disabilities can communicate through social media, including educators,  journalists and conferences. The movement uses hip hop music as a means of expression for disabled people, providing them an opportunity to share their experiences.

History
Krip Hop was founded by Leroy F. Moore Jr., an African American writer, poet, community activist and feminist who was diagnosed with cerebral palsy. Moore was born in New York in 1967 to an activist father loosely connected to the Black Panthers. His upbringing sensitized Moore to the challenges faced by African Americans and disabled people. As a youth, Moore discovered that most people had little knowledge of the historical impact of disabled African Americans. This led him to begin research, initially in the music industry.

Moore first spotlighted disabled hip hop artists in the early 2000s. He co-produced and co-hosted a three-part series on what he called "Krip Hop" for a Berkeley, California radio station. The "Krip Hop" series appeared on KPFA's Pushing Limits, which focuses on news, arts, and culture for the disabled community. The series' popularity inspired Moore to create Krip Hop Nation for disabled musicians, since little cultural work or music by people with disabilities had been recognized. "The Krip-Hop movement really makes the pain of the people feel visible", Moore said. "It goes a lot deeper than what people can see."

Krip Hop Nation
The primary goal of Krip Hop Nation is to increase awareness in music and media outlets of the talents, history and rights of people with disabilities in the hip-hop industry. In an interview, Moore expressed the hope that by listening to his music the audience would understand the need to question authority and the information provided to them. He said he wanted his listeners to learn about their community and to become open to all people. Issues such as racism and sexism are commonly discussed, and Moore hoped that people would examine possible ableism in their attitudes. According to Moore, Krip Hop Nation goes beyond producing music and the bling-bling associated with hip hop; the movement is about advocacy, education and overcoming oppression. For Moore the movement has sought to reclaim negative terms associated with disability (such as "crazy", "lame", "retarded" and "cripple"), using them to shock people into understanding and respecting the disabled African American community. Krip Hop Nation addresses discrimination against disabled artists in hip hop by publishing articles and hosting events, lectures and workshops. It has over 300 members worldwide.

Moore has explained that "Krip Hop" is a play on "Hip Hop." Although the "Krip" part of the name refers to "crippled", it is spelled with a "k" to avoid association with the Crips.

Accomplishments
Krip Hop Nation has released two mixtape CDs, held conferences with the PeaceOut HomoHop organization at UC Berkeley and New York University, organized and hosted a six-artist performance in Sacramento, California, staged a show at Disability and Deaf Arts (DADA) in Liverpool and hosted a Krip Hop Nation conference in Atlanta, Georgia for Black History Month in 2011 featuring musicians, writers and activists.

In February 2012, DJ Quad of 5th Battalion joined Krip Hop Nation to co-produce a CD with 17 disabled artists from the UK, the US and Germany on police brutality and profiling. Among the collaborators was Emmitt Thrower of Artist Magnet. The documentary was scheduled for release in 2014.

Notable musicians
Krip Hop Nation includes artists such as Counterclockwise, Preach-man, Wheelchair Sports Camp, Miss Money and Fezo. Kalyn Heffernan is a rapper from Denver, Colorado. She heads Wheelchair Sports Camp, an experimental hip-hop group with jazz and avant-garde influences. Her raps are political, with many discussing the difficulties she faces as a disabled person in America. Heffernan created beats for Haitian rappers in the area dealing with extreme poverty after the 2010 earthquake. In July 2017 she was arrested after a 3-day sitdown protest at her GOP Senator's office, remarking "I'd rather go to jail than to die without Medicaid" in regards to Trumpcare.

See also
Dance Therapy
Disability
Hip Hop
POOR Magazine

References

External links
 Krip-Hop Nation
 POOR Magazine

Deafness arts organizations
Disability in the arts
Hip hop
Disability organizations based in the United States